Doctors of Harmony, from Elkhart, Indiana, is a Barbershop quartet that won the 1947 SPEBSQSA international competition.

Main Article on Barbershop wiki:
Doctors of Harmony

References
 AIC entry (archived)

Barbershop quartets
Barbershop Harmony Society